Cypella elegans is a herbaceous plant species in the genus Cypella endemic to Jujuy Province in northwestern Argentina .

References

External links

Iridaceae
Plants described in 1917
Endemic flora of Argentina
Taxa named by Carlo Luigi Spegazzini